Permafrost is the farthest north literary journal in the United States. Based out of the University of Alaska Fairbanks, Permafrost publishes poetry, fiction, non-fiction, and visual art, and has published interviews with such notable Alaskan writers as Gerri Brightwell, Derick Burleson, and Richard Nelson. Recent cover art has been predominantly influenced by Alaskan culture, highlighting the likes of painter David Mollett and photographer Larry McNeil.

Having celebrated its 30th anniversary in 2008, Permafrost continues to publish notable writers/artists such as Allen Ginsberg, Ilya Kaminsky, and Andy Warhol alongside up and coming writers such as Dan Pinkerton, Billy Thorpe, and Siân Griffiths. More recently, Permafrost has published work by BJ Hollars and Brian Oliu. The journal is staffed by volunteers from the UAF English Department and specifically students of the MFA in Creative Writing program.

Permafrost Book Prizes
Each year the journal sponsors an annual book prize. The winner of the 2010 competition was poet Richard Sonnenmoser for Science-Magic School. Past winners include Briton Shurley (2007), Holly Iglesias (1999), and Laurie O'Brien (1994).

Circulation and Specs
As one of the growing journals in the field, Permafrosts circulation reached 500 copies in 2008. Situated as the farthest north journal, Permafrost publishers are 350 miles from the nearest city, and separated by country borders beyond that. The journal continues to increase its circulation yearly due to swelling online sales, growing interest from libraries, and the continued support of the Alaska State Council on the Arts and the Alaska Humanities Forum.

In 2008, the journal's dimensions were 8.5 by 5 inches, and was 196 pages in length.

Past Editors

See also
 List of literary magazines

External links
 Permafrost official site
 UAF English Department
 Council of Literary Magazines and Presses

Literary magazines published in the United States
Student magazines published in the United States
Annual magazines published in the United States
Magazines established in 1999
Magazines published in Alaska
University of Alaska Fairbanks
1999 establishments in Alaska